Mohammad Ali Naqi is a Bangladeshi architect and the current Vice-Chancellor of Stamford University Bangladesh.

Education

Naqi passed his SSC and HSC in 1980 and 1982 subsequently. He completed his bachelor's in 1989 and masters in 2004 from Bangladesh University of Engineering and Technology.

Career
Naqi started his career as a lecturer at Khulna University in 1991 and went on to become the head of the department. In 2006, he joined Stamford University Bangladesh as the chair of the Department of Architecture.

References

Living people
Academic staff of Khulna University
Bangladesh University of Engineering and Technology alumni
Year of birth missing (living people)
Place of birth missing (living people)
Bangladeshi architects